In mycology, a stipe is the stem or stalk-like feature supporting the cap of a mushroom. Like all tissues of the mushroom other than the hymenium, the stipe is composed of sterile hyphal tissue. In many instances, however, the fertile hymenium extends down the stipe some distance. Fungi that have stipes are said to be stipitate.

The evolutionary benefit of a stipe is generally considered to be in mediating spore dispersal. An elevated mushroom will more easily release its spores into wind currents or onto passing animals. Nevertheless, many mushrooms do not have stipes, including cup fungi, puffballs, earthstars, some polypores, jelly fungi, ergots, and smuts.

It is often the case that features of the stipe are required to make a positive identification of a mushroom.  Such distinguishing characters include:
 the texture of the stipe (fibrous, brittle, chalky, leathery, firm, etc.)
 whether it has remains of a partial veil (such as an annulus or cortina) or universal veil (volva)
 whether the stipes of many mushrooms fuse at their base
 its general size and shape
 whether the stipe extends underground in a root-like structure (a rhizome)

When collecting mushrooms for identification it is critical to maintain all these characters intact by digging the mushroom out of the soil, rather than cutting it off mid-stipe.

Drawings

References

Fungal morphology and anatomy

ja:キノコの部位#柄